New Zealand competed at the 1997 World Championships in Athletics held in Athens, Greece. The team won one medal, a gold, which was won by Beatrice Faumuina in the discus, which placed them equal 22nd on the medal table. This was New Zealand's first medal at a World Athletics Championships.

Entrants

Key
Q = Qualified for the next round by placing (track events) or automatic qualifying target (field events)
q = Qualified for the next round as a fastest loser (track events) or by position (field events)
AR = Area (Continental) Record
NR = National record
PB = Personal best
SB = Season best
- = Round not applicable for the event
 x(y): x = placing in heat/group; y = overall placing

Individual Events

Note: Doug Pirini completed three events in the decathlon, but withdrew after failing to record a height in the high jump.

Team Events

References

Nations at the 1997 World Championships in Athletics
New Zealand at the World Championships in Athletics
World Championships in Athletics